This is the discography of American bubblegum pop band the Archies.

Albums

Studio albums

Compilation albums

Box sets

Singles

References

Discographies of American artists
Pop music group discographies
Rock music group discographies